Percival Gordon Ogden (24 February 1886 – 13 July 1967) was an Australian rules footballer who played with and coached Essendon in the Victorian Football League (VFL).

A rover, Ogden started his career with Collingwood in 1905. He played just four games with the club before moving to Association team Preston and did not return to the VFL until 1910 with Essendon. Ogden was a member of Essendon's back-to-back premiership wins in 1911 and 1912. After Essendon disbanded during the Great War, Ogden was captain-coach of Preston (then in junior ranks) in 1916–17 before returning when Essendon resumed in 1918. He spent 1919 as captain and the following two were as captain-coach.

Ogden effectively retired from League ranks and was captain-coach of Northcote (where he lived) in 1922. Believing his form was still good enough for League football, he returned to Essendon in 1923, but as a "new" player under zoning rules introduced post-war, he was residentially tied to Fitzroy and his permit was refused. Fitzroy expressed no interest in Ogden and rather than stand down for more than half a season to qualify for Essendon, he returned again to Preston. Ogden retired at the end of the 1925 season just before Preston were re-admitted to Association ranks.

Ogden also had the honour of captaining Victoria in a game against South Australia in 1920.

He had two sons who played in the VFL, Gordon and Terry.

References

External links

Profile at Essendonfc.com

1886 births
Essendon Football Club players
Essendon Football Club Premiership players
Essendon Football Club coaches
Collingwood Football Club players
Northcote Football Club players
Northcote Football Club coaches
Preston Football Club (VFA) players
Preston Football Club (VFA) coaches
Essendon Association Football Club players
Australian rules footballers from Melbourne
1967 deaths
Two-time VFL/AFL Premiership players
Australian rules footballers from New South Wales
People from Northcote, Victoria